Celtic Kings: Rage of War is a game developed by Haemimont Games. It is set during the conquest of Gaul by Julius Caesar.

In Italy and Spain, the game is titled as Imperivm: La guerra gallica and Imperivm: La Guerra de las Galias.
The game got a digital re-release on the GOG.com digital platform sometime before mid-2009, with May 28, 2009 a good certainty, and Steam digital platform on September 5, 2019.

Overview 

Celtic Kings takes place in ancient Roman times, during the years that Julius Caesar was the military leader of the Roman Empire. There are three main modes: Adventure, single player (a classic real time strategy Skirmish mode), and multiplayer. Adventure mode includes a tutorial and the main story. In both campaigns, players control a hero named Larax. In the main story, he loses his wife in a Teutonic raid. In grief, he swears vengeance, and gives his body and soul to Kathubodua, the Goddess of War, to enable him to achieve his revenge.

Genre 

This game uses both role-playing and real-time strategy (RTS) elements. Units are controlled in a standard RTS fashion. Most units have the ability to gain levels. This is done either through fighting, training (to a certain limit, usually level 12), or, in the case of the priest/druid, learning from units with more experience (levels) . In adventure mode, the player will constantly move between maps, which are all greatly varying in landscape and objectives. For dialogue, it is in the form of text, where the player has a choice of what to say.

Gameplay 

There are two main factions, the Romans and the Gauls. These two factions are diverse from each other, in terms of gameplay. Their units are different, with the superior Roman technology, while the Gauls depend on their numbers. There is a third, non-playable faction, the Teutons, a nomadic people who live in tents throughout the map. If non-allied units get too close to the tent, the Teutons will engage them in combat. These tents can be captured by killing all the Teutons within proximity of the tent.

There are two main resources in game play: food and gold. Food is mainly produced from villages or can sometimes be bought or captured. Food is an important resource for keeping units alive, since they can starve, thus losing health, and weakening them in battle. Gold comes mainly from taxing the people of the cities, though it can also be captured or borrowed (with a significant interest rate). It is used to produce and upgrade units. Unlike a traditional RTS, the player's resources are not "global". Mules and supply ships are used to transport resources between cities.

Structures cannot be constructed, neither can they be destroyed, They can only be captured. This is much easier with a catapult, an immobile artillery unit built by up to ten military units to demolish enemy defenses. This job is also possible with archers, but less effective. All structures have a loyalty rating, which gradually decreases if enemy military units are ordered to capture it. If the rating reaches zero, the structure surrenders to the conqueror's side.

There are hero units in the game, which are considerably more powerful than normal units. Heroes can attach units to themselves, giving them the ability to march in formation. The hero's experience is shared between the units under his/her command, making them stronger. Heroes can also recover artifacts from various temples located throughout the map, giving them special, albeit limited abilities such as healing friendly units and increased prowess in battle.

Reception

Celtic Kings became a hit in Spain, with sales above 100,000 units in the region by 2003. By 2006, it sold over 1 million copies in Spain, Italy and Latin America alone.

The game was well received by critics. IGN gave the game a rating of 8.2/10, GameSpot gave it a rating of 8.4/10, while Gamespy rated the game a 4.5/5. Gone Gold  gave the game a score of 87/100, and Games Domain gave 4.5/5. The game was praised for its success in mixing the elements of RTS and RPG. Some criticisms include the somewhat overblown soundtrack and the voice acting.

ELiTeD scored the game 85 of 100, and it said "I found Celtic Kings to be one of the easiest and more fun strategy games that I have played in quite awhile." ActionTrip scored it 83 of 100.

References

External links
 
  

2002 video games
Fiction set in Roman Gaul
Real-time strategy video games
Video games developed in Bulgaria
Windows games
Windows-only games
Video games set in antiquity
Multiplayer and single-player video games
Strategy First games
Depictions of Julius Caesar in video games